Oluwole Ogundare Ezekiel commonly known as  Wole Ogundare   (born 24 August 1984) is a Nigerian film director, Creative Director, music video director and producer.

Early life
Wole Ogundare was born in Lagos, Nigeria in August 1984. He attended Jelly Las Nursery and Primary School and attending Folbim High School, Lagos. He later proceeded to Obafemi Awolowo University where studied Information Technology and Osun State Polytechnicobtained a BSc in mass communication .

Career
Ogundare first directed project was in 2016 for the adventures Nigerian series " Lola the series" produced by Celine Dimas.
In 2020, he directed the Nigerian movie Violated (a short film about Rape and Abuse) which starred Seun Sean Jimoh and Lekan Ogunjobi.

Partial filmography

Film

Selected music videography (as director)
2016: "Bouce it remix" by MC Galaxy ft Beniton X Double Dose
2018: "Stamina Remix" by Korede Bello X Gyptian  X Young D X DJ Tunez
2016: "Hello" by MC Galaxy
2016: "Shupe For Ayade" by MC Galaxy
2019: "Koloko" by BM X Nestreya 
2019: "Live Your Life" by Ms. Bodega X Gyptian X MC Galaxy X Neza X Neil Bajayo X Young D
2018: "This Woman" by Maxi Priest X Yemi Alade
2019: "Body Work" by Young D X Harmonize X Reekado Banks
2016: "Snap O (Snapchat) " by MC Galaxy X Neza X Mucicmanty X Kelli Pyle 
2017: "Sokutu" by Koffi X Small Doctor X Qdot X QDot

Awards and nominations

References

External links
   
Oluwole Ogundare at FilmFreeway

Nigerian music video directors
People from Lagos
Nigerian film directors
Nigerian film producers
1984 births
Living people
Yoruba people
Creative directors
Residents of Lagos